Margaret Pierce, M.D., F.A.C.S. is a fictional character from the American television medical drama Grey's Anatomy, which airs on the American Broadcasting Company (ABC) in the United States. The character was created by series producer Shonda Rhimes and is portrayed by actress Kelly McCreary from the tenth season's penultimate episode onwards. It is revealed in the season ten finale, Maggie's biological parents are Richard Webber (James Pickens Jr.) and Ellis Grey (Kate Burton), making her Meredith's half-sister. McCreary was upgraded to a series regular in the eleventh episode of the eleventh season.

Pierce has been described as "perky" and "chatty", as well as focusing mostly on her academic career rather than social life. She graduated from medical school at 19 and became the head of her department at the young age of 27 years old.

Storylines

Maggie is introduced in the 23rd episode of the tenth season. Cristina Yang interviews various different candidates to replace the head of her department in Cardiothoracic surgery. Maggie, having finished high school and medical school early at 19, becomes head of her department at 27 years old. It is revealed in the season 10 finale "Fear (of the Unknown)" that Maggie's biological mother was Ellis Grey. Richard Webber is shocked by this, knowing he is her biological father. Throughout the eleventh season, Webber struggles to deal with the revelation and keeps it from Maggie. Maggie explains that 2 years prior, she looked for her birth mom and needed to go to the court for the records. She found out that she was dead, but got her name, and discovered that she was an amazing surgeon that worked at the Seattle Grace Hospital. She stated that that's not why she took the job, but it's "a little bit" why she took the interview.

When Maggie identifies Meredith Grey, her half-sister, she attempts to bond with her. However, Meredith attempts to take charge and conflicts with her on a case. After several arguments, Maggie tells Meredith that she is her half-sister. Meredith, in disbelief, points out that she would know that her mother would be pregnant when she was five years old, as Maggie is five years younger than her. Meredith works with Alex Karev to decide whether Maggie is lying or if she is wrong. They discover she is correct. Meredith gets flashes back to the time of her mother's crisis at five years old, and remembers being at a hospital and hearing a screaming baby. After several weeks, Webber admits to Maggie that he is her father. Maggie is angry at him. Later, when he comes to apologize for not being there as a father, Maggie corrects him and says he is not her father, she has adoptive parents she loves, and that she is only angry because of his dishonesty and making her look foolish and naive for weeks. Derek and Meredith decide to have Maggie come over to their house for dinner, to get to know Maggie better. After Maggie says yes, Derek decides it is a good idea to ask Richard as well. Richard reluctantly agrees. The night of the dinner, Maggie and Richard show up, but no-one answers. Maggie leaves him after that. Maggie develops a relationship with radiologist, Ethan Boyd. She admits her awkwardness in relationships, having ended her previous engagement to Dean, who she was unable to sleep in the same bed with. Meredith ends up in a bind with no one to watch her kids, so Maggie offers to watch them. Richard and Maggie eventually come to good terms, and Maggie's helping with Meredith's kids help her integrate into her family home more. Maggie learns about the histories of Meredith, Alex and Callie Torres as they commemorate their dead friend, George O'Malley.

After Derek's death, Meredith abandons Seattle for a year, leaving Maggie a note. Maggie is shocked by this, and admits she felt abandoned by Meredith right when they were starting to become a family. She invites Webber to a Christmas party, noticing his loneliness. Meredith eventually returns home, hugging Maggie and re-integrating into her old family home. While Maggie and her colleagues are busy dealing with Keith Gardner after a tunnel collapse, Maggie gets a phone call that her parents are getting a divorce. Her mother confesses to her that she'd been having an affair with their car serviceman for eleven years and they had only stayed together for her sake, but were getting a divorce now that she was out on her own. Maggie is emotional about this, but she doesn't want to bother her colleagues about it. Later, she confides in Meredith over the issue, but feels it is silly in comparison to her husband's death. Meredith, however, says she can tell her anything and she should come to her whenever she is having a problem. After Meredith buys her house back from Alex, she invites Maggie and Amelia Shepherd to move in with her. They assist Meredith in caring for her kids. Maggie also often mediates between Meredith and Amelia, who frequently get into fights over little things. She often helps with Meredith's three kids, with each "sister" in charge of getting one kid ready for the day.

In the twelfth season, Maggie develops a relationship with intern Andrew DeLuca. Maggie and DeLuca keep their relationship private to avoid difficulties at work. DeLuca grows frustrated with their secrecy, so Maggie abruptly decides to go public. When this happens, DeLuca becomes uncomfortable with the way he is viewed by others because he is dating an attending, and doesn't want others to think he is getting special treatment. He also feels intimidated by her authority and ultimately ends things with her. Maggie attempts to move on and develops an interest in Nathan Riggs. However, she is unaware that Meredith has a sexual relationship with Nathan. She confides in Meredith about her feelings at Amelia's wedding to Owen Hunt. In the thirteenth season, Maggie is hurt when she discovers that Meredith had been lying to her about Alex's actions assaulting DeLuca. She tells her to never lie to her again, but Meredith continues to hide her relationship with Riggs. Riggs tells Meredith that she needs to tell Maggie and Maggie works up the courage to ask Riggs out, but Meredith told him to say no. Maggie’s mother Diane also comes to the hospital and is treated by Jackson Avery for what turns out to be cancer. Before Diane succumbs to her illness, she encourages Maggie to live a fuller life outside of her career. Jackson is there for Maggie as she grieves, and the two grow closer. It isn’t until Jackson's ex-wife April Kepner points out their bond that Jackson and Maggie realize their feelings for one another. In the fourteenth season, Maggie and Jackson initially try to bury their feelings, but Jackson decides to pursue her. They eventually begin a romantic relationship and attend Alex and Jo Wilson's wedding together.

Throughout the fifteenth season, Jackson and Maggie's relationship continues to deepen, and the two frequently spend time with Catherine and Richard in the form of family outings and weekly dinners. During Catherine's cancer surgery, Maggie acts as a source of comfort for Jackson, having lost her own mom from breast cancer just a few years before. Jackson and Maggie eventually decide to move into together, but they have a falling out during a camping trip and instead end their relationship. Following her break up with Jackson, Maggie focuses on surgery and operates on her cousin, Sabi. When the procedure goes wrong and Sabi dies, Maggie experiences intense depression, steps back from medicine, and quits her job at Grey Sloan. Things worsen when Sabi's family sues Maggie for medical malpractice. Maggie settles out of court at Richard's urging and accepts his offer of a job at Pac North. Eventually, Maggie rejoins Grey Sloan after Catherine Fox buys Pac North to win her back. 

In Season 16, Maggie begins a relationship with Winston Ndugu, who she had worked with during her residency and reconnected with at a medical conference in the previous season. Because Winston is employed at a hospital in Boston, he and Maggie keep their long-distance relationship alive through frequent video chats and phone calls. As the COVID-19 pandemic worsens, Winston travels to Seattle to surprise Maggie and help out at the hospital and their relationship grows deeper. Winston soon after proposes to Maggie, and she accepts; they marry in the Season 17 finale.

Development

Casting and creation

On April 5, 2014, TVLine reported that Kelly McCreary best known for her series regular role on The CW's short lived medical drama Emily Owens, M.D. and recent guest appearances on Scandal had been cast in a guest star role. McCreary was slated to debut on the May 8, 2014 episode. On October 23, 2014, it was announced that McCreary was promoted to series regular after being credited as guest-starring until the eleventh episode. It was a couple of months after McCreary wrapped her stint on Scandal that she was invited to audition for Grey's. McCreary revealed that she originally auditioned for the character of "Claudette" with dummy sides, unbeknownst to her. The only information McCreary had about the character was "that she was adopted, that she would recur, and she was going to be a very important storyline." Just before the script reading for the season 10 finale, Rhimes summoned McCreary to inform her of Maggie's true identity. "I was really psyched" McCreary revealed when Rhimes informed her of Maggie's lineage. "I felt really honored to be the one to accept the challenge." However, it wasn't until McCreary experienced the reactions to Maggie's existence from her fellow cast mates that McCreary realized just how big of a deal the character would be.

The character's potential existence was first referenced in the press in February 2009 when Michael Ausiello hinted at the possibility of Meredith having a half-sibling, the product of her mother's affair with Richard. Initial speculation pointed to Jesse Williams' Jackson Avery as the child, but the actor refuted those rumors. Shonda Rhimes revealed that the character had always been a part of the original story plans, but the character's existence was not set in stone until season 4.

Characterization
Kelly McCreary expressed her excitement about how special Maggie in an interview with BuddyTV. "I just feel like it's a rare opportunity to be able to play somebody that is so complex and fully realized and smart and fierce and compassionate and awkward and the whole thing." Maggie is very good at her job so she can find a place in a professional capacity, but in her personal life,  she "gets more than she bargained for" McCreary said. "I think she's a really good doctor" McCreary said of Maggie. "She's obviously super-bright. She's very young to be as high in her field as she is." McCreary further described Maggie as a "really great problem-solver." Maggie is "very compassionate" and at the same time can "keep a clear head and do the right thing medically all the time." McCreary further described Maggie as "so dynamic." While Maggie initially "came across as all business," Kelly McCreary relishes in playing "Maggie's neurotic, existential, meltdown side." "Maggie also won't really back down from a fight; she's very decisive."

Introduction 

Kate Aurthur noted that until Maggie's introduction, Grey's was not "known for dropping in stories that it planted seasons before -- it's never been filled with twisty mythology." Rhimes insisted that the timing wasn't right for Maggie's introduction in previous seasons. In season 3, the series introduced Meredith's paternal half-sister Lexie Grey (Chyler Leigh) and it was at that time that Maggie became a serious topic of discussion. Though Lexie was killed off in the season 8 finale, "Flight," Rhimes felt it was still too soon for Maggie's arrival. The scribe even thought the show might end without the character ever being introduced. "Then we hit this moment in time and I remember walking into the writers' room and going, 'You guys, it's time.'"

When Maggie makes the sudden revelation that she is Ellis' child to Richard, viewers are left to wonder about her history. The second episode of the season puts Maggie front and center. The episode appropriately titled "Puzzle With a Piece Missing," focuses on Maggie's struggle to fit in throughout her life, even with her own adoptive parents whom she is very different from. Though she is very close with her parents, and they get along very well, she's grown up "still feeling like something's missing." Kelly McCreary said "That's what's really compelling to me about Maggie: that sort of dark underbelly of this person who seems to really have it all together." Maggie struggles to build relationships with her colleagues. She unknowingly shares confidential information about Alex Karev (Justin Chambers) and she gets she also insults the hospital board when she tries to prop up Miranda Bailey (Chandra Wilson). Though she's got the "best intentions," things backfire. Maggie also serves as a "mentor" to Jo Wilson (Camilla Luddington). As Maggie discovers she has several things in common with Richard, the stage is set for Maggie to learn that Richard is her father.

"I think people will relate to the awkwardness of being the new kid at school" McCreary said of the episode's comedic tone. Despite so many different interactions, the episode highlights "Maggie's loneliness." The Maggie-centric episode also featured Kelly McCreary stepping into the coveted role of narrator for the episode, which was usually reserved for Ellen Pompeo's Meredith, and on occasion other veteran cast members. "It was overwhelming and very surprising" McCreary said of being the center of attention so early into her Grey's tenure. She continued, "I felt terrified and also really grateful that they trusted me with the institution about of Grey's Anatomy for a whole episode." McCreary relished in finally learning the character's history. "[It] was a huge gift to have 65 pages worth of material telling me exactly who she is. It was great!"

Reception

Critics responded positively to the development of Pierce in her centric episode "Puzzle With a Piece Missing". Fempop gave a largely positive review writing, "Puzzle With a Piece Missing is a funny and insightful look both into this latest interloper and the established characters of Grey’s." praising the new addition, "Thankfully she’s (Pierce) her own person, confident and happy to bring the thunder and put everyone, from interns to the chief of surgery, into their places."

Entertainment Weekly lauded the episode stating, "Coming into the second week without Cristina Yang, Grey’s was smart to focus all of its attention on the newcomer. With most other main characters only making occasional cameos, it made it more difficult to feel Yang’s absence. And by showing Maggie’s side of the story, it made her more relatable. It was a win-win." adding on McCreary's character, " this episode is about how Maggie is her own, very likable person."

On her character TV Fanatic wrote, Overall, we got to know Maggie a little better and it's nice to see that she's made some friends. It was a fair episode that showed Maggie's basically a work in progress. Maybe she'll grow on us eventually."

For the thirteenth season, Vulture writer, Maggie Fremont spoke positively about the character: "It’s never easy for a long-running series to introduce a new character, especially when that character is meant to immediately fit in with the rest of the ensemble. But when Maggie Pierce arrived in season ten, that’s exactly what Grey’s Anatomy did. It could’ve been easy to dislike her — she showed up to take over cardio as Cristina Yang was leaving, for chrissakes! She was yet another one of Meredith’s long-lost sisters. The cards were really stacked against Maggie Pierce. Yet, thanks to the writers and Kelly McCreary’s terrific performance, Maggie was immediately endearing. She is weird and neurotic and cheerful. She is nothing like Cristina, but she fills a void that Meredith needs filled in order to function. Can you really imagine Grey’s without Maggie Pierce?"

References

External links 

Maggie Piece at ABC.com
 Maggie Pierce on IMDb

Grey's Anatomy characters
Fictional African-American people
Fictional characters from Seattle
Fictional storytellers
Television characters introduced in 2014
Fictional surgeons
Fictional female doctors
Adoptee characters in television
Fictional cardiothoracic surgeons
American female characters in television
Crossover characters in television